The Katherine Emery Estate is a historic house located at 1155 Oak Grove Avenue in San Marino, California. It is named for prominent California resident Katherine Sinclair Emery, who commissioned its construction, and has no connection to 1940s Hollywood character actress Katherine Emery.

Prominent Southern California architect Myron Hunt designed the Tudor Revival house, which was completed in 1928. The house's design includes multiple gable ends and dormers adorned with carved bargeboards and half-timbering. Other characteristic Tudor Revival elements include the stucco walls, groups of casement windows, and steep roof. The interior of the house features a Tudor great hall with a staircase, tracery windows, and oak woodwork.

Landscape architects Florence Yoch & Lucile Council worked with Hunt, designing the gardens surrounding the house. Major features of their work include terraces with stone balustrades.

The house was added to the National Register of Historic Places on January 10, 2011.

See also
 National Register of Historic Places listings in Los Angeles County, California

References

Houses in Los Angeles County, California
San Marino, California
Houses completed in 1928
Houses on the National Register of Historic Places in California
Myron Hunt buildings
Tudor Revival architecture in California
Buildings and structures on the National Register of Historic Places in Los Angeles County, California